Mark Joseph Machina (born October 27, 1954) is an American economist noted for work in non-standard decision theory. He is currently a distinguished professor at the University of California, San Diego. The Marschak–Machina triangle, a probability diagram used in expected utility theory, bears his name, along with that of Jacob Marschak.

Machina Triangle 

The Machina Triangle is a way of representing a three dimensional probability vector in a two dimensional space. The probability of a given outcome is denoted by a euclidean distance from the point that represents a lottery (probability).

References

External links 
 Machina's homepage at the Department of Economics at the University of California

1954 births
Living people
Economists from California
Massachusetts Institute of Technology alumni
University of California, San Diego faculty
Fellows of the Econometric Society
21st-century American economists